The Sardinian regional election of 2004 took place on 12–13 June 2004.

The center-left businessman Renato Soru was elected President of the Region defeating Mauro Pili, who won the 1999 election but served as President just for two years between 2001 and 2003.

New electoral system
Because of the political imbalances created by the previous electoral system, which potentially allowed the election of a candidate to the presidency without giving him a majority in the Regional Council as it happened after the 1999 election, in 2003 Sardinia adopted a new electoral law.

The new electoral system was the national Tatarella Law of 1995, used by most of Italian regions to elect their Council. Sixty-four councillors were elected in provincial constituencies by proportional representation using the largest remainder method with a Droop quota and open lists; remained seats and votes were grouped at regional level where a Hare quota is used, and then distributed to provincial party lists.

Nine councillors were elected at-large using a general ticket: parties were grouped in alliances, and the alliance which received a plurality of votes elected all its candidates, its leader becoming the President of Sardinia. A possible second round election between the two main candidates was abolished.

Council apportionment
According to the official 2001 Italian census, the 64 Council seats which must be covered by proportional representation were so distributed between Sardinian provinces.

It must be underlined that this allocation is not fixed. Remained seats and votes after proportional distribution, are all grouped at regional level and divided by party lists.

Results

|-
| colspan=11|
|-
|- bgcolor="#E9E9E9"
!style="background-color:#E9E9E9" align=left rowspan=2 valign=bottom|Candidate
!colspan="3" align="center" valign=top|Regional lists
!colspan="4" align="center" valign=top|Provincial lists
! align="center" valign=top|Total
|-
|- bgcolor="#E9E9E9"
|align="center" valign=top|votes
|align="center" valign=top|%
|align="center" valign=top|seats
|align="center" valign=top|Party
|align="center" valign=top|votes
|align="center" valign=top|%
|align="center" valign=top|seats
|align="center" valign=top|group
|-
!style="background-color:pink" rowspan="9" align="left" valign="top"|Renato Soru
|rowspan="9" valign="top"|487,692
|rowspan="9" valign="top"|50.16
|rowspan="9" valign="top"|8

|align="left"| Democrats of the Left
| align=right|112,757
| align=right|13.28
| align=right|13
| rowspan="9" align="right" valign="top"|51
|-
|align="left"| Democracy is Freedom – The Daisy
| align=right|95,256
| align=right|10.90
| align=right|10
|-
|align="left"| Sardinia Project
| align=right|66,690
| align=right|7.85
| align=right|7
|-
|align="left"| Communist Refoundation Party
| align=right|35,142
| align=right|4.14
| align=right|5
|-
|align="left"| Italian Democratic Socialists
| align=right|32,245
| align=right|3.80
| align=right|3
|-
|align="left"| Union of Democrats for Europe
| align=right|22,610
| align=right|2.66
| align=right|3
|-
|align="left"| Party of Italian Communists
| align=right|16,010
| align=right|1.88
| align=right|1
|-
|align="left"| Italy of Values
| align=right|8,588
| align=right|1.01
| align=right|1
|-
|align="left"| Federation of the Greens
| align=right|7,048
| align=right|0.83
| align=right|0

|-
!style="background-color:lightblue" rowspan="6" align="left" valign="top"|Mauro Pili
|rowspan="6" valign="top"|394,271
|rowspan="6" valign="top"|40.53
|rowspan="6" valign="top"|1

|align="left"| Forza Italia
| align=right|128,563
| align=right|15.13
| align=right|10
| rowspan="6" align="right" valign="top"|30
|-
|align="left"| Union of Christian and Centre Democrats
| align=right|88,179
| align=right|10.39
| align=right|7
|-
|align="left"| National Alliance
| align=right|63,001
| align=right|7.42
| align=right|5
|-
|align="left"| Sardinian Reformers
| align=right|50,953
| align=right|6.00
| align=right|4
|-
|align="left"| Fortza Paris
| align=right|39,086
| align=right|4.49
| align=right|3
|-
|align="left"| New Italian Socialist Party
| align=right|8,965
| align=right|1.06
| align=right|0

|-
!style="background-color:darkgrey" rowspan="2" align="left" valign="top"|Giacomo Sanna
|rowspan="2" valign="top"|36,720
|rowspan="2" valign="top"|3.72
|rowspan="2" valign="top"|-

|align="left"| Sardinian Action Party
| align=right|32,859
| align=right|3.87
| align=right|2
| rowspan="2" align="right" valign="top"|2
|-
|align="left"| Sardinia Nation
| align=right|5,031
| align=right|0.59
| align=right|0

|-
!style="background-color:orange" rowspan="1" align="left" valign="top"|Mario Floris
|rowspan="1" valign="top"|35,460
|rowspan="1" valign="top"|3.64
|rowspan="1" valign="top"|-

|align="left"| Union of Sardinians & allies
| align=right|37,356
| align=right|4.39
| align=right|2
| rowspan="1" align="right" valign="top"|2

|-
!style="background-color:#FE6F5E" rowspan="1" align="left" valign="top"|Gavino Sale
|rowspan="1" valign="top"|18,638
|rowspan="1" valign="top"|1.95
|rowspan="1" valign="top"|-

|align="left"| Independence Republic of Sardinia 
| align=right|9,724
| align=right|1.36
| align=right|0
| rowspan="1" align="right" valign="top"|-

|- bgcolor="#E9E9E9"
!rowspan="1" align="left" valign="top"|Total candidates
!rowspan="1" align="right" valign="top"|972,981
!rowspan="1" align="right" valign="top"|100.00
!rowspan="1" align="right" valign="top"|9
!rowspan="1" align="left" valign="top"|Total parties
!rowspan="1" align="right" valign="top"|849,004
!rowspan="1" align="right" valign="top"|100.00
!rowspan="1" align="right" valign="top"|76
!rowspan="1" align="right" valign="top"|85
|}

Source: Regional Council of Sardinia

Elections in Sardinia
2004 elections in Italy
June 2004 events in Europe